Echos is the eighth studio album by Switzerland-based Gothic rock band Lacrimosa. It features classically influenced Gothic-themed rock music. The title is German for "echoes". The record was released on 27 January 2003 by Hall Of Sermon.

Style
Echos begins with an orchestral overture of 13 minutes length and continues with a mix of symphonic elements and hard rock that is typical of Lacrimosa. However the entire album is oriented towards classical instruments rather than hard electric guitars. Singer Anne Nurmi's only solo track "Apart" has been compared to music by the Cocteau Twins. Generally, the album has been seen as a typical work by Lacrimosa.

Reception

The album received positive reviews from the critics and stayed in the German charts for four weeks peaking at position 13. The single "Durch Nacht und Flut" reached position 52 in the German charts.

Allmusic lauded the subtlety of the songs while the German Laut magazine was positive about Lacrimosa following their own concept instead of being influenced by expectations from the fans. While writing a very positive review, the German Powermetal magazine still marked that producer and composer Tilo Wolff's musical concept had begun to become too abstract and demanding for a broad audience to comprehend.

Track listing

Special edition
There is also "Special edition", released by 'Scarecrow Records' (SC03067) at the same time and only released in Mexico, it contains a bonus track, "Road to Pain" (4:21), and a slightly different Digipack which also contains a second booklet with the Spanish translation of the lyrics (except "Road to Pain").

Personnel
Cello, Violin [Gamben] – V. Sondeckis
Choir – Rosenberg Ensemble 
Choir [Alt] – Melanie Kirschke, Uli Brandt, Ursula Ritter 
Choir [Bass] – Frederick Martin, Joachim Gebardt* 
Choir [Sopran] – Bettina Hunold, Catharina Boutari, Raphaela Mayhaus
Choir [Tenor] – Klaus Bülow, Olaf Senkbeil, Yenz Leonhard* 
Concertmaster [Spielmann-schnyder Philharmonie] – Ludgar Hendrich 
Conductor [Deutsches Filmorchester Babelsberg] – Günter Joseck 
Conductor [Spielmann-schnyder Philharmonie] – Christopher Clayton 
Design – Tilo Wolff 
Design [Painted By] – Stelio Diamantopoulos 
Double Bass – Katharina Bunners 
Drums – Manne Uhlig, Thomas Nack
Electric Guitar, Acoustic Guitar, Electric Bass, Acoustic Bass, Mellotron – Jay P. (3)
Keyboards, Voice – Anne Nurmi
Orchestra – Deutsches Filmorchester Babelsberg
Spielmann-Schnyder Philharmonie* Performer – Lacrimosa
Piano, Programmed By, Voice – Tilo Wolff
Viola – Sebastian Marock
Violin [1st] – Stefan Pintev
Violin [2nd] – Rodrigo Reichel
Written, composed, arranged, orchestrated, produced by Tilo Wolff
Mastered by Herge Halvé
Photography – Burgis Wehry

References

2003 albums
Lacrimosa (band) albums